Erik Virgen (born November 18, 1999) is an American professional soccer player who plays as a midfielder.

Career
Born in Tucson, Arizona, Virgen started his career in the youth set-up of FC Tucson. He then spent two years with the Real Salt Lake academy side before playing college soccer for the New Mexico Lobos in 2018. He also appeared for FC Tucson when the club participated in the USL PDL, making three appearances in 2017.

On May 18, 2019, Virgen signed his first professional contract with FC Tucson in USL League One. The next month, on June 8, Virgen made his competitive debut for the club in a League One match against the Richmond Kickers. He started and played the whole match as the match ended 0–0. He then scored his first professional goal on August 24 in a league match against Orlando City B. He scored FC Tucson's third goal in the 69th-minute as the club won 3–1.

International
Virgen has been part of the United States U15 and United States U18 sides.

Career statistics

References

External links 
 USL League One Profile
 New Mexico Lobos Profile

1999 births
Living people
American soccer players
Real Salt Lake players
FC Tucson players
Association football midfielders
Soccer players from Tucson, Arizona
USL League Two players
USL League One players
New Mexico Lobos men's soccer players